La Piscine may refer to:

La Piscine Museum in Roubaix
La Piscine (film), 1969 film by Jacques Deray
Swimming Pool (2003 film), film by François Ozon

See also
Piscina, shallow basin placed near the altar of a church
Swimming pool (disambiguation)